Rennae Stubbs and Jared Palmer were the defending champions but only Stubbs competed that year with Todd Woodbridge.

Stubbs and Woodbridge lost in the semifinals to Barbara Schett and Joshua Eagle.

Corina Morariu and Ellis Ferreira won in the final 6–1, 6–3 against Schett and Eagle.

Seeds
Champion seeds are indicated in bold text while text in italics indicates the round in which those seeds were eliminated.

Draw

Final

Top half

Bottom half

References
 2001 Australian Open Mixed Doubles Draw
 2001 Australian Open – Doubles draws and results at the International Tennis Federation

Mixed Doubles
Australian Open (tennis) by year – Mixed doubles